Callejones Site is an archeological site consisting of a batey (a large clearing where ceremonies took place) located in Lares, Puerto Rico.  It is of the Early Ostionoid (pre-Taino) (AD 600–1200) and Late Ostionoid (Taíno) (AD 1200–1500) prehistoric eras and has been researched by Jose Oliver, a researcher from Yale University, and by Samuel Kirkland Lothrop.

See also 

 Ball Court/Plaza Sites of Puerto Rico and the U.S. Virgin Islands

References

Archaeological sites on the National Register of Historic Places in Puerto Rico
Lares, Puerto Rico
Pre-Columbian archaeological sites
Native American history of Puerto Rico
Sports venues on the National Register of Historic Places
Sports venues in Puerto Rico